The 1945–46 Copa Federación de España was the second staging (old competition) of the Copa Federación de España, a knockout competition for Spanish football clubs.

The competition began on 10 February 1946 and ended with the final on 20 June 1946, where Alavés became champion after defeating Sueca.

Competition

First round

Group 1

Group 1-A

Group 1-B

Group 2

Group 3

Group 4

Group 5

Group 6

Group 7

Group 8

Group 9

Group 10

Group 11

Group 12

Group 13

Group 14

Second round

Third round

Fourth round

Semi-finals

Final

Copa Federación de España seasons
Fed